Silvana Bajraktarević (born Zilha Bajraktarević; 18 February 1939 – 10 October 1976), known professionally as Silvana Armenulić, was a Bosnian singer-songwriter and actress and one of the most prominent commercial folk music and traditional sevdalinka singers in Yugoslavia. She is called the "Queen of Sevdalinka". Her life was cut short when she died in a car crash at the age of 37, but she continues to be well regarded in the region and she is recognized for her unique singing style and voice. Armenulić's song "Šta će mi život" (What Do I Need a Life for), written by her friend and contemporary Toma Zdravković, is one of the best-selling singles from the former Yugoslavia.

Two of her sisters were also professional singers: Mirsada "Mirjana" Bajraktarević and Hajrudina "Dina" Bajraktarević.

Life

1939–55: Early life, family and interest in music
An ethnic Bosniak, born Zilha Bajraktarević in Doboj, Kingdom of Yugoslavia, she was the third of thirteen children in a Muslim family. Her father was Mehmed Bajraktarević (1909–1966), a local cake shop operator, and her mother was Hajrija (1916–2008). Zilha survived a bout with diphtheria as a child shortly after World War II.

Zilha had a brother named Hajrudin who died about two weeks after being mauled by a dog in the 1940s. After her brother's death, her father found solace in alcohol and solitude, neglecting the family and his business. After her father's cake shop closed, the family suffered greatly. Some of her earliest memories were of her father's absence and the World War II, when mother Hajrija and the children hid in the basement from the Ustasha troops. The family of thirteen children included Zilha's sisters Mirsada, Hajrudina, Abida, and Ševka, and brothers Hajrudin, Muhamed, Izudin, Abudin, and Ismet. Her sister Ševka's son Sabahudin Bilalović became a professional basketball player who died at age 43 of a heart attack on the beach while swimming with his son. Ten years later, Ševka and her husband Lutvo both died of natural causes in September 2013, just days apart.

Zilha began singing at an early age and she would later say that she got her voice from her father, a bohemian. As a child, she would sing to him while sitting in his lap. But when she had thoughts of pursuing a professional singing career, her father was not supportive. Then one day, after coming home hung over from a night of drinking, and with the wave of a hand, he said "Go! If you really want to be a singer, go." In 1947, she was enrolled into elementary school, where she learned to play the mandolin, which was a gift from her parents. After that, she played the mandolin and sang more and more, but her grades in school kept declining. By the time she reached the eighth grade, all interest in school had been lost and she had made a name for herself locally as prominent kafana singer.

1959–68: Marriage and relationships
Zilha met her husband, tennis player Radmilo Armenulić, in 1959 when she was singing at the Grand Casino in Belgrade. They married two years later on 26 October 1961 and their daughter Gordana was born on 13 January 1965. After seven years of marriage, Radmilo allegedly cheated on Zilha with her friend, singer Lepa Lukić. After that she recorded a song called "Sedam godina ljubavi" (Seven Years of Love). She and her husband were believed to have divorced, although many years later, Radmilo revealed that they had separated but stayed legally married until her death.

Zilha was an ethnic Muslim and her husband Radmilo was a Serb, making theirs an ethnically mixed marriage in multiethnic Yugoslavia. Radmilo's mother Gordana disapproved of the marriage as did Zilha's father Mehmed who even refused to speak to his daughter. In fact, Zilha was not allowed into his home until his death in 1965, when she returned to Doboj for his funeral.

After her marriage ended, many men vied for her affection, including politicians Stane Dolanc and Branko Pešić.

Career

Career beginnings
Sometime in 1953, a young Zilha was heard singing in a Doboj kafana by Aca Stepić, and it was a voice he did not forget. They met again six years later in 1959, at the Hotel Bristol in Belgrade, after she started singing professionally. She was performing with the orchestra of Jovica Marinović and the singer/drummer was Cune Gojković. After that, she began singing with Aca in the Grand Casino in Belgrade, where she met her future husband Radmilo.

Zilha moved to Sarajevo at the age of sixteen in 1954, where she lived with her aunt and sang in local kafanas for money. One night Zilha met accordionist Ismet Alajbegović Šerbo in the Sarajevo suburb of Ilidža. Delighted with her voice, he wanted to make her part of his orchestra, but the girl was underage and needed her parents permission. Of course, they gave consent and Šerbo promised her that she would have food, a place to stay and a salary of 20,000 dinars monthly. There, she entered the professional world of showbusiness.

On a cold night in Leskovac in spring 1958, Zilha was taking walk through a park before a performance at the garden of a restaurant called Hisar in a hotel, when she saw a young man sleeping on a bench. It was Toma Zdravković. She approached him, woke him up, sat down and started a conversation. She asked him "Where are you from? What do you do?". He told her he was from a village, and had come to the city looking for a job. He couldn't find a job, and was broke with no way to pay his fare back home. Zilha wished to help him. She brought him to her performance, even handing her microphone over to him at one point.

When she heard Toma sing, she was amazed, according to Za društvo u ćošku, written by Aleksandar Gajović, a journalist and cultural worker. She begged the manager of the hotel to help Toma find a job. Toma began singing with her, and later she got him his own record deal and he began recording and touring on his own. The two became legends of the former Yugoslavia.

Stage name
Eventually she moved to Belgrade, the capital of Yugoslavia, to further her singing career. There she adopted the mononymous stage name "Silvana" after the Italian actress Silvana Mangano. When she was a young girl, her friends would jokingly call her Silvana after watching the film Bitter Rice (1949), because she resembled the actress.

1965–69: First recordings and television
While in Belgrade, Silvana frequently performed in the bohemian neighborhood Skadarlija. During this time, she was offered several recording contracts from the incredibly competitive Yugoslav record labels. The first song she ever recorded was the Bosnian sevdalinka "Nad izvorom vrba se nadvila" (Over the Spring, the Willow Tree Hung), although it wasn't officially released until her 1968 album Otiš'o si bez pozdrava (You Left Without Saying Goodbye), three years after her first album was released. After recording a single record for the label Diskos in Aleksandrovac, she was invited by the label PGP-RTB to record in the then-popular duet format. Silvana recorded duet albums with singers Petar Tanasijević, Aleksandar Trandafilović, Slavko Perović and Dragan Živković in the 1960s. After both companies competitively issued her records for a period of time, Silvana grew "tired" of singing in duets. The opportunity to record as a soloist came from the Zagreb-based record label Jugoton.

Her career had taken off rapidly and she became one of the biggest commercial folk stars in Yugoslavia. This led to numerous and well-publicized country-wide singing engagements. She also appeared in many popular TV sitcoms such as Ljubav na seoski način (Love in the Rural Way) with famous Serbian comedian Miodrag Petrović Čkalja and folksy movies such as Građani sela Luga (Citizens of the Village Luga).

1969–76: "Šta će mi život" and The Deer Hunt
In 1969, she and singer Toma Zdravković sang in the same group, and Zdravković wrote her biggest hit "Šta će mi život, bez tebe dragi" (What Do I Need a Life for, Without You Darling):

...While touring, we ran into one another a lot in different towns all over Yugoslavia, and in 1969, we even sang in the same band. I was already a well known and sought-after composer. She was completely down. She was constantly depressed and wanted me to write a song for her. But I didn't really know what. All of my songs were inspired by women I fancied and love-life, but we were good ol' friends. I had no inspiration. Until one day, I went drinking with my friends, we were drunk for three days straight, and the fourth day I woke up at a hotel, went down to the lounge, ordered a cup of coffee and just like that while getting over a hangover, I wrote "Šta će mi život". I recorded the song in the studio and wanted to use it for a festival coming up, but when she heard it, she wanted to have it. And what could I do? It was her song, inspired by her life, and her problems. I gave her the song and it was a bingo. I wish I had never written it. She died seven years later, it was like the song came true. It would have been better if she had never recorded that song. It would have been better if she had never become famous. She might still be alive...
 
The song became one of the biggest folk hits ever written in Yugoslavia, sold over 300,000 copies, and transformed Zdravković and Silvana herself into superstars. But Silvana's life ironically ended seven years later.

In a March 1971 interview with the newspaper Novosti, Silvana did not hide the fact that the same rejection and criticism that she faced at the start of her career, continued well into her successful days.

She co-starred in 1972 film The Deer Hunt with Boris Dvornik, Ivo Serdar and Miha Baloh, among others. The film was written and directed by Fadil Hadžić.

On a Belgrade-based television New Year's Eve program awaiting the year 1972, the director Dejan Karaklajić suggested Silvana to dress in a bikini and jump in a pool to resemble Hollywood actress Esther Williams. She initially refused and did not like the way her body looked in the swimsuit but was forced to do it as the sponsors had paid 13 million dinars. She cried and then agreed to appear on the program, but not in the swimsuit and refused to swim in a pool. The stunt sparked outrage among her fan base, who were not used to seeing her sexualize herself. She was also banned from all Yugoslav television for refusing to follow orders.

Throughout the 1970s and leading up to her death in 1976, she had several hit songs: "Rane moje" (My Wounds), "Ciganine, sviraj sviraj" (Gypsy, Play Play), "Srce gori, jer te voli" (My Heart Burns, For It Loves You), "Grli me, ljubi me" (Hug Me, Kiss Me), "Ja nemam prava nikoga da volim" (I Have No Right to Love Anyone), "Srećo moja" (Happiness of Mine), "Kišo, kišo tiho padaj" (Rain, Rain, Fall Quietly) and "Život teče" (Life Flows).

As she became more popular in Yugoslavia, she often performed for the President Josip Broz Tito and the First Lady Jovanka Broz. She was friends with many communist politicians including Branko Mikulić, Hamdija Pozderac and Džemal Bijedić. During a radio interview in Sarajevo in 1973, she stated that she was a fan of fellow sevdalinka singer Safet Isović and called him a "darling."

Death

Before death
After Armenulić's death, friends said that she often worried about her fate. In October 1971, she was in a car accident that almost claimed her life, and which irresistibly recalls the tragedy that took her life five years later. Three months after the accident, she said, "I am a big pessimist. I'm afraid of life. The future. What will happen tomorrow. I fear that, for me, there might not even be a tomorrow...."

In the final few years of her life, Armenulić became increasingly obsessed with learning her own fate, so much so that she learned all she could about astrology, telepathy, and spoke with self-proclaimed prophets. In early August 1976, just two months before her death, she was on tour in Bulgaria and decided to seize the opportunity to meet with mystic Baba Vanga. The meeting was unpleasant. Vanga, who was blind, only sat and stared out a window with her back to Armenulić. She did not speak. After a long time, Vanga finally spoke: "Nothing. You do not have to pay. I do not want to speak with you. Not now. Go and come back in three months." As Armenulić turned around and walked towards the door, Vanga said: "Wait. In fact, you will not be able to come. Go, go. If you can come back in three months, do so." She took this as confirmation that she would die and left Vanga's home in tears.

Armenulić and her younger sister Mirsada Bajraktarević were at the opening of restaurant called "Lenin Bar" on 9 October 1976, the day before their deaths. Since the interior of the restaurant was meant to resemble a cave, there were spikes in the shape of stalactites hanging from the ceiling. Armenulić hit her head on one when getting up from her chair, which caused huge headache the rest of that day and the next.

Death and funeral
On Sunday, 10 October 1976, at around 9:15pm CEST, Armenulić died in a car crash near the Serbian village of Kolari in Smederevo along with her 25-year-old pregnant sister Mirsada and violinist/Radio Belgrade folk orchestra conductor Miodrag "Rade" Jašarević. They were driving in a Ford Granada car en route from Aleksandrovac to Belgrade after a concert. Armenulić was behind the wheel when they left, but sometime between their departure and the crash, 60-year-old Jašarević had taken the wheel.

Their car was reportedly traveling 130 km/h, when it veered into oncoming traffic lanes at the 60th kilometer of the Belgrade—Niš highway, colliding head-on with a FAP truck driven by 52-year-old Rastko Grujić. Armenulić had been sleeping in the passenger's side seat and her younger sister was asleep in the back seat.

Initially, only the death of Jašarević was reported, as television shows refused to mention Armenulić because of the 1972 incident during a live broadcast on New Year's Eve show, which got her banned from television. The exact cause of the accident is unknown, but it is believed that the crash is directly related to a brake problem. The Ford Granada they were driving was recalled for "dangerous structural defects observed in the control mechanism". A notification was sent to all customers that the models manufactured between September 1975 and June 1976 were faulty. Owners were advised to return the cars; further details regarding these events remained obscure.

Between 30,000 and 50,000 people attended their funeral, including singers Lepa Lukić and Hašim Kučuk Hoki (who himself died in a near-identical car crash on 26 November 2002). She and her sister were buried side by side in the cemetery Novo groblje.

1976–2021: Aftermath
The singer Lepa Lukić has said that she was asked to perform at the concert that day but overslept for the first time in her career and did not make it to the concert; she later stated that she believes, had she gone with them, she would have lost her life in the crash with the sisters. In 2013, Lepa revealed in an interview that she hasn't driven a car since the sisters' deaths, out of fear that she would share their fate.

During the war in Bosnia of the 1990s, Armenulić's mother Hajrija and sister Dina fled their home in Doboj to Denmark. In 2004, Hajrija (by then nearly 88 years old), filed a lawsuit against her former son-in-law and Armenulić's ex-husband Radmilo Armenulić, the suit alleged that the six-bedroom apartment in which he lived with his second wife, belonged to the Bajraktarević family. She said that Armenulić bought the apartment after she divorced Radmilo and planned on living there with her daughter Gordana, but shortly thereafter lost her life. Radmilo commented to the press, that he was still legally married to Armenulić up until her death and alleged that the apartment was left to their daughter Gordana. After Silvana's death, Radmilo got custody of the then twelve-year-old girl, and being her legal guardian, owned the apartment.

Silvana's mother Hajrija lived into her 90s, dying in 2008. Five years after their mother's death, Silvana's oldest sister Ševka died on 30 September 2013 in Trebinje at the age of 79, leaving Dina the last living of the female Bajraktarević children.

In a 2013 interview, her former husband Radmilo stated he still visits her grave and always leaves fresh flowers. He also said that Silvana's friend Predrag Živković Tozovac visited her grave frequently until his death in 2021.

Legacy
Fellow Yugoslavian singer Lepa Brena has twice covered Armenulić's songs; in 1995 she covered "Šta će mi život" for her album Kazna Božija, and in 2013 she covered "Ciganine ti što sviraš" on Izvorne i novokomponovane narodne pesme. Although Silvana and Brena never met (Brena's career started a few years after Silvana's death), they did have a mutual acquaintance: their manager Milovan Ilić Minimaks.

On 10 October 2011, the 35th anniversary of her death, Exploziv, a show on Serbian television channel Prva Srpska Televizija, included a ten-minute segment in which they interviewed some of Armenulić's surviving friends and her daughter, Gordana. The segment also included a reenactment of the car crash.

Serb writer Dragan Marković released a biography about her life entitled Knjiga o Silvani (Book About Silvana) on 9 December 2011. Silvana's daughter Gordana was among the people interviewed for the book.

Discography

Albums and singles

Other recorded songs
This is a list of songs recorded by Armenulić that were not released on any of her albums. They are mostly covers of centuries-old Bosnian sevdalinkas.
Aj, san zaspala
Bol boluje mlado momče
Bosa Mara Bosnu pregazila
Ciganka sam mala
Crven fesić
Djevojka je pod đulom zaspala
Djevojka viče s visoka brda
Đul Zulejha
Harmoniko moja
Igrali se konji vrani
Ko se ono brijegom šeće?
Mene moja zaklinjala majka
San zaspala
Simbil cvijeće
Sinoć dođe tuđe momče
Svi dilberi, samo moga nema
Ti nikad nisi htio znati
Vrbas voda nosila jablana

Filmography

Film
The Deer Hunt (1972)
Saniteks (1973); short film

Television
Ljubav na seoski način ("Love in the Rural Way", 1970); 4 episodes
Milorade, kam bek (1970); TV film
Građani sela Luga ("Citizens of the Village Lug", 1972); 2 episodes
Koncert za komšije ("Concert for the Neighbors", 1972); TV film

See also
List of people who died in road accidents
Mirsada Mirjana Bajraktarević
Dina Bajraktarević

External links

References

1939 births
1976 deaths
People from Doboj
Bosnia and Herzegovina Muslims
Yugoslav women singers
20th-century Bosnia and Herzegovina women singers
Sevdalinka
Road incident deaths in Yugoslavia
Road incident deaths in Serbia